Armella is a surname. Notable people with the surname include:

Eduardo Armella (1928–2011), Argentine sports shooter
Jorge Carral Armella (born 1983), Mexican former swimmer
Pedro Armella (born 1930), Argentine former sports shooter
Pedro Aspe Armella (born 1950), Mexican economist

See also 
 Armella Nicolas or La bonne Armelle, was a Breton serving-maid important in French popular Catholic piety